WPKE (1240 AM) is a radio station broadcasting a classic hits format. Licensed to Pikeville, Kentucky, United States, the station is currently owned by Lynn Parrish, through licensee Mountain Top Media LLC. WPKE's programming is also carried on Suddenlink Cable channel 9 in Pikeville.

Previous logo

References

External links
 Official Website
 
 
 

PKE
Classic hits radio stations in the United States
Radio stations established in 1949
1949 establishments in Kentucky
Pikeville, Kentucky